Anthony Ray Parker (born May 13, 1958) is an American actor.

Parker was born in Saginaw, Michigan, United States, and currently resides in Los Angeles, California. For years during the late 1990s and early 2000s, Parker settled in Auckland, New Zealand and had a prominent career on television in various shows as Suzanne Paul's sidekick. He appeared in the film The Matrix as the character Dozer.  In 2006, Parker starred in John Cena's film The Marine. He also appeared in the horror film Dead Air.

He has filmed a number of television shows and movies in Australia and New Zealand, including Hercules in the Maze of the Minotaur.

In 2007, he performed the role of Buddy McDeere, the Head coach of the Russian boxer, Anton Kolchin in the Russian movie Shadowboxing 2: Revenge.

Parker has appeared in the Starz production of Spartacus: War of the Damned in the role of a rebel slave named Sanus in 2013.

He has advertised for a browser application called RealStew. He owned Club Physical, a short lived cafe in New Zealand.

Parker has advocated for suicide prevention.

Personal life
Anthony Ray Parker has a daughter and two sons. His son Joseph Lavell Parker received widespread media attention after alleged involvement in gang rapes in the Roast Busters scandal. Police in New Zealand have now issued a warrant for Joseph Parker's arrest.

Filmography

Film

Television

References

External links

1958 births
Living people
20th-century American male actors
21st-century American male actors
African-American male actors
American expatriates in New Zealand
American male film actors
American male television actors
Male actors from Michigan
People from Saginaw, Michigan
20th-century African-American people
21st-century African-American people